Yuculta is from the Kwak'wala language of northern Vancouver Island and may refer to:

 Yucultas, a Southern Kwakiutl First Nations people of Campbell River and Quadra Island
 Yuculta Rapids, in the Cordero Channel near the mouth of Bute Inlet

See also
 Yucuita
 Yukulta